Zoom is an American live-action children's television series in which child cast members present a variety of types of content, including games, recipes, science experiments, and short plays, based on ideas sent in by children, and is a remake from an existing 1972 version of the same name.  Created by Christopher Sarson, the series originally aired on PBS Kids from January 4, 1999 to May 6, 2005, with reruns airing until September 2, 2007, and was produced by WGBH-TV in Boston.

Description
Zoom premiered in 1999 in largely the same format as the original series, with many of the same games and continued to feature content and ideas submitted by viewers. This second Zoom series ran for seven seasons (1999–2005), each featuring seven children—32 in total—called "Zoomers". It completed taping a pilot episode in September 1995 with a different cast, which was circulated among funders by early 1997 and aired on television in November of that year. On December 9, 2004, it was announced that the show had been cancelled after seven seasons. The cancellation was blamed on the rising competition of kids TV, which resulted in a noticeable decline in ratings for the show. The series finale aired on May 6, 2005 on most PBS member stations, without any reference of the show’s ending. Reruns of the final three seasons aired on some PBS stations until fall 2007, when the show was pulled from the PBS lineup entirely.

Season overview

Cast members

Segments
ZOOMsci: Experiments to explore. Sometimes this segment features brain teasers or observation surveys that require viewers to send in results.
ZOOMalong: (season 1) Activities that viewers are encouraged to participate in.
ZOOMphenom: (seasons 2-3, 5-7) Observations or phenomenon discoveries.
ZOOMzinger: Challenges or interesting tricks viewers share.
ZOOMdo: Creative handicrafts or activities.
ZOOMgame: Games and activities that are fun for a group. Zoomers sometimes form teams to compete with each other in relay races.
CafeZOOM and ZOOM Znack: Simple recipes to make.
ZOOMplayhouse: Skits and dramas by viewers and portrayed by the Zoomers.
ZOOMchat: Discussion on topics involving children's issues or questions from viewers.
Zmail: Sharing of fan mail and answering questions from viewers.
ZOOM Reviews Books (seasons 3–5): Book reviews recommended by viewers.
WhatZup: Interviews from children that answer interesting questions.
ZOOMvid: (seasons 1–5) Home videos and short films made by viewers.
ZOOMguest: Special feature of children with unique talents or hobbies.
ZOOMA Cum Laude (seasons 1–2) and ZOOM Into Action (seasons 3–7) pay tribute to children who volunteered in the community or done charitable deeds.
Zoops: Viewers share their embarrassing moments. (Season 1-3) Blooper clips are sometimes shown here. (The embarrassing moments were dropped after season 3 and they were replaced with blooper clips from seasons 4–7, although the blooper clips had also been featured since season 2.)
Fannee Doolee: A segment that centered on a character who likes any person, place, thing or concept with double letters in it but hates its non-double-lettered equivalent.
Ubbi Dubbi: Short skits that uses Ubbi Dubbi (adding the "ub" in every vowel sound in English.) Occasionally this segment is done like an advertisement.
ZOOM Tale(s) (seasons 1–5) Original stories written and illustrated by viewers.
ZOOM '70s Flashback (season 7): A clip from the original 1972 series.

Merchandise
Although the complete series was never released in any format, four videos were released based on the show:
Party with Zoom (June 22, 1999)
The Zoomers Video Special: The Making of ZOOM! (June 22, 1999)
Zoom: America Kids Respond (October 9, 2001)
Zoom: America's Kids Remember (October 8, 2002)

Additionally, a two-disc set with four full episodes plus various footage from all six seasons of the 1970s version was released on October 28, 2008.

Four books by Amy E. Sklansky  compiled from material submitted by viewers were published by Little, Brown and Company:
Zoom Zingers (1999)
Zoom Fun With Friends (1999)
Zoomdos You Can Do! (2000)
Zoomfun Outside (2000)

See also

Fetch! with Ruff Ruffman
Arthur

References

External links
 
"Zoom: America's kids respond"
ZOOM (1972-1978): Children’s Community and Public Television in the 1970s
KeithSchofield.com - Hard 'N Phirm: "Pi" (QuickTime & Windows Media)

Television series by WGBH
English-language television shows
1990s American children's television series
2000s American children's television series
1999 American television series debuts
2005 American television series endings
PBS Kids shows
PBS original programming
Children's sketch comedy
Television series about children
American children's education television series
Television shows filmed in Boston